The following is a list of notable events and releases that happened in 2012 in music in South Korea.

Notable events and achievements 
 January 11–12 – the 26th Golden Disc Awards take place, the first time it was held in January. Super Junior and Girls' Generation win the grand prizes.
 January 31 – Girls' Generation become the first K-pop group to appear on an American late night talk show, performing the English version of "The Boys" on the Late Show with David Letterman.
February 1 – Girls' Generation similarly appear on Live! with Kelly, the first U.S. morning talk show appearance from a K-pop artist.
February 29 – Kiha & The Faces and IU win the grand prizes at the 18th Korean Music Awards.
June – The Korean music industry grosses nearly $3.4 billion in the first half of 2012, according to Billboard estimates, a 27.8% increase from the same period a year prior.
June 22 – Show Me the Money airs its first season, which is considered a pivotal work in making hip hop a mainstream genre in South Korea.
July 28 – 2NE1 embark on their New Evolution Global Tour, considered the first world tour by a K-pop girl group.
September 10 – Big Bang announces their three concert dome tour in Japan, making them the first Korean artist to perform at three dome stadiums in a single tour.
September 26 – Psy's "Gangnam Style" attains a peak of number 2 on the Billboard Hot 100, the highest for a K-pop song on the chart.
October 16 – KCON 2012 takes place at the Verizon Amphitheater in Irvine, California, the first K-pop dedicated convention in the United States.
November 18 – Psy becomes the first Korean artist to perform at the American Music Awards.
November 19 – The third annual Korean Popular Culture and Arts Awards take place. Psy, Song Chang-sik and Geum Sa-hyang are awarded the Order of Cultural Merit; Park Seong-yeon and Kim Chang-wan receive the Presidential Commendation; and Na Yoon-sun, 2NE1 and Lee Eun-ha receive the Prime Minister's Commendation.
November 24 – "Gangnam Style" becomes the most viewed video on YouTube with 805 million views, surpassing Justin Bieber's "Baby".
November 30 – Psy, BigBang, and Super Junior win the grand prizes at the 2012 MAMA.
December 14 – Busker Busker, Beast and Psy win the grand prizes at the annual Melon Music Awards.
December 18 – "Gangnam Style" is ranked number one on YouTube's list of top trending video of 2012.
December 21 – The music video for Gangnam Style" becomes the first video in YouTube history to surpass 1 billion views.

Award shows and festivals

Award ceremonies

Festivals

Debuting and disbanded in 2012

Debuted groups

100%
15&
24K
2BiC
A.cian
A-Jax
A-Prince
AOA
B.A.P
Big Star
BTOB
C-Clown
Crayon Pop
Cross Gene
D-Unit
EvoL
EXID
EXO
Fiestar
From the Airport
Gangkiz
Girls' Generation-TTS
GLAM
Hello Venus
Hyungdon and Daejun
JJ Project
Lunafly
Mr. Mr.
NU'EST
Puretty
Rainbow Pixie
She'z
Skarf
Skull & Haha
Spica
Sunny Days
Tahiti
Tasty
The Barberettes
The SeeYa
The Solutions
Tiny-G
Two X
VIXX
Wonder Boyz
ZE:A Five

Solo debuts

Ailee
Allen Kim
Anda
Baek A-yeon
Ben
Han Seung-yeon
John Park
Juniel
Kim Sung-kyu
Lee Hi
Loco
Stephanie
Yong Jun-hyung

Disbanded groups
2NB
Big Mama
Black Pearl
Broken Valentine
JQT
Loveholics
T-max

Releases in 2012

First quarter

January

February

March

Second quarter

April

May

June

Third quarter

July

August

September

Fourth quarter

October

November

December

Charts
List of number-one hits of 2012 (South Korea)
List of number-one albums of 2012 (South Korea)

See also
2012 in South Korea
List of South Korean films of 2012

References

 
South Korean music
K-pop